Katie van Scherpenberg (born 1940) is a Brazilian artist.

Biography 
van Scherpenberg studied at the University of Munich from 1962 to 1964. She studied under Oskar Kokoschka in Salzburg. In 1966, she studied printing at the Museum of Modern Art in Rio de Janeiro. Since the 1980s, Scherpenberg's work has consisted of abstract painting. Her use of extreme materials contributes to the meaning of her works.

References 

1940 births
Living people
20th-century Brazilian women artists
21st-century Brazilian women artists
21st-century Brazilian artists
People from São Paulo
Brazilian expatriates in Germany